George Newcomen Morphy (20 April 1884 – 14 April 1946) was an Irish solicitor and athlete, notable for his success in running and cycling.  At the 1908 Summer Olympics in London, he competed for the United Kingdom of Great Britain and Ireland.

Morphy was born in Dublin, Ireland and entered Trinity College, Dublin in 1902, graduating in 1907 with a Bachelor of Arts (BA) degree. As a student, he specialised in running the 440 yards, 880 yards and one mile races. In 1905 he set an Irish record in cycle racing, with a time of 1:56.8 in the 880 yards dash.

He then became a solicitor, but continued his athletic career.  In the 800 metres, Morphy finished third in his semifinal heat and did not advance to the final. In Irish athletics competitions, he won seven national titles between 1908 and 1910.

During World War I, Morphy served in the Royal Army Service Corps from 1914 to 1920, rising to the rank of captain.

He died in Burwash, East Sussex.

References

Sources
 
 
 
 

1884 births
1946 deaths
Athletes (track and field) at the 1908 Summer Olympics
Irish male middle-distance runners
Irish male sprinters
Olympic athletes of Great Britain
Sportspeople from Dublin (city)
Alumni of Trinity College Dublin
Royal Army Service Corps officers
British Army personnel of World War I
Irish solicitors
People from Burwash